Wokingham is a constituency in Berkshire represented in the House of Commons of the Parliament of the United Kingdom since 1987 by John Redwood, a Conservative.

Constituency profile
The seat covers the prosperous town of Wokingham, the southern suburbs of Reading, and a rural area to the west. Residents are significantly wealthier than the UK average, reflected in high property prices.

History 
Originally, Wokingham was part of a larger constituency of Berkshire, which returned two Members of Parliament (MPs), increased to three in the Reform Act of 1832. In the Redistribution of Seats Act of 1885 Berkshire was divided into three county constituencies, Northern (Abingdon), Southern (Newbury), and Eastern (Wokingham), and two borough constituencies, Reading and New Windsor, each returning one member.   The constituency was abolished under the Representation of the People Act 1918 being largely replaced by the new Windsor Division of Berkshire, with Wokingham itself being added to the Newbury Division.

The second version of the seat was created for the 1950 general election.  From 1983, its borders have gradually been moved westwards as new constituencies were created in the east of the county.

The constituency has been represented since 1987 by the high-profile Conservative John Redwood.

Boundaries and boundary changes

1885–1918: The Sessional Divisions of Maidenhead and Windsor, part of the Sessional Division of Wokingham, and in the Sessional Division of Reading the parishes of East Swallowfield and West Swallowfield.

1950–1955: The Borough of Wokingham, and the Rural Districts of Easthampstead and Wokingham.

1955–1974: The Borough of Wokingham, the Rural Districts of Easthampstead and Wokingham, and the East ward of the County Borough of Reading.  From the 1964 general election, the Park ward of Reading replaced the East ward following a revision to the local authority wards.

1974–1983: The Borough of Wokingham, the Rural District of Easthampstead, and in the Rural District of Wokingham the parishes of Remenham, Ruscombe, St Nicholas Hurst, Twyford, Wargrave, and Wokingham Without.

The Park ward of the County Borough of Reading was transferred to the re-established County Constituency of Reading South, along with western parts of the Rural District of Wokingham.

1983–1997: The District of Wokingham wards of Bulmershe, California, Charvil, Coronation, Emmbrook, Evendons, Hurst, Little Hungerford, Loddon, Norreys, Redhatch, Remenham and Wargrave, St Sebastian's, Sonning, South Lake, Twyford and Ruscombe, Wescott, Whitegates, and Winnersh.

The seat regained north-western parts of the abolished County Constituency of Reading South, and eastern areas comprising the District of Bracknell (formerly the Rural District of Easthampstead) formed the bulk of the new County Constituency of East Berkshire.

1997–2010: The District of Wokingham wards of Arborfield, Barkham, Emmbrook, Evendons, Little Hungerford, Norreys, Redhatch, Shinfield, Swallowfield, Wescott, and Winnersh, and the District of Newbury wards of Burghfield and Mortimer.

The boundaries moved westwards, gaining parts of Reading East (including Shinfield) and of Newbury. The seat lost northern areas to Reading East and the new County Constituency of Maidenhead, as well as the ward of Wokingham Without in the south to the new County Constituency of Bracknell.

2010–present: The District of Wokingham wards of Arborfield, Barkham, Emmbrook, Evendons, Hawkedon, Hillside, Maiden Erlegh, Norreys, Shinfield North, Shinfield South, Swallowfield, Wescott, and Winnersh, and the District of West Berkshire wards of Burghfield, Mortimer, and Sulhamstead.

This change saw a further minor gain from Newbury.

The seat is currently centred on the southern part of Wokingham district, including a small part of the east of West Berkshire. It is in the South East region of England.

The neighbouring constituencies (clockwise from north) are: Reading West, Reading East, Maidenhead, Bracknell, North East Hampshire, Basingstoke, North West Hampshire and Newbury.

MPs 1885–1918

MPs since 1950

Elections

Elections in the 2010s

Elections in the 2000s

Elections in the 1990s

Elections in the 1980s

Elections in the 1970s

Elections in the 1960s

Elections in the 1950s

Elections in the 1910s

Elections in the 1900s

Elections in the 1890s

 Caused by Russell's death.

Elections in the 1880s

See also
 List of parliamentary constituencies in Berkshire

References

Parliamentary constituencies in Berkshire
Constituencies of the Parliament of the United Kingdom established in 1885
Constituencies of the Parliament of the United Kingdom disestablished in 1918
Constituencies of the Parliament of the United Kingdom established in 1950
Parliamentary constituency